Maya Shoef (born 1 May 1988) is an Israeli actress and is most famous for her roles as a protagonist of the Israeli television series Split and Alex: Pros and Cons.

Biography
Maya Shoef was born at 1 May 1988 in Tel Aviv, Israel. She has one brother. When she was a child she wanted to become a veterinarian. Later, she wanted to be an actress. In 2008, Shoef appeared in the Israeli version of the High School Musical. In 2009, she played a recurring character in the third season of the Israeli soap opera Champion. In the same year she got the lead role in the Israeli television series Alex Pros and Cons (Hebrew:אלכס בעד ונגד). She played the girl Alex who has to write a newspaper article and falls in love with Jordan, a foreign worker from the library.

After this she was cast for one of the main roles in the supernatural drama Split. She played Zohar Grin a student and daughter of the principal for four years.

Then she went to New York to study acting. In 2013 she graduated from the Stella Adler Studio of Acting. She got back to Israel in 2014 and played a role in the television series Dead for a second.

In addition to being an actress, Shoef is also a singer. She was one of the hosts of the Israeli Festigal in 2010.

Filmography

Film

Television

External links

Maya Shoef at Ishim (Israeli film data base)

References

1988 births
Israeli Jews
People from Tel Aviv
Israeli television actresses
Living people